Stanisław Gołąb (July 26, 1902 – April 30, 1980) was a Polish mathematician from Kraków, working in particular on the field of affine geometry.

In 1932, he proved that the perimeter of the unit disc respect to a given metric can take any value in between 6 and 8, and that these extremal values are obtained if and only if the unit disc is an affine regular hexagon resp. a parallelogram.

Selected works
 S. Gołąb: Quelques problèmes métriques de la géometrie de Minkowski, Trav. de l'Acad. Mines Cracovie 6 (1932), 1–79
 Golab, S., Über einen algebraischen Satz, welcher in der Theorie der geometrischen Objekte auftritt, Beiträge zur Algebra und Geometrie 2 (1974) 7–10.
 Golab, S.; Swiatak, H.: Note on Inner Products in Vector Spaces.  Aequationes Mathematicae (1972) 74.
 Golab, S.: Über das Carnotsche Skalarprodukt in schwach normierten Vektorräumen. Aequationes Mathematicae 13 (1975) 9–13.
 Golab,S., Sur un problème de la métrique angulaire dans la géometrie de Minkowski, Aequationes Mathematicae (1971) 121.
 Golab, S., Über die Grundlagen der affinen Geometrie., Jahresbericht DMV 71 (1969) 138–155.

Notes

External links
 List of Golab's articles at U. of Göttingen, Germany

1902 births
1980 deaths
20th-century  Polish mathematicians
Geometers
Scientists from Kraków